The fourteenth and final season of the American police procedural television series NCIS: Los Angeles premiered on October 9, 2022, on CBS, for the 2022–23 television season, consisting in total of 21 episodes.

NCIS: Los Angeles follows a fictional team of special agents from the Office of Special Projects of the Naval Criminal Investigative Service. The season stars Chris O'Donnell, Daniela Ruah, Eric Christian Olsen, Medalion Rahimi, Caleb Castille, Gerald McRaney, and LL Cool J. A crossover event with NCIS and NCIS: Hawaiʻi took place during the season in episode 10.

Cast and characters

Main 
 Chris O'Donnell as Grisha "G." Callen, NCIS Supervisory Special Agent (SSA) and Team leader
 Daniela Ruah as Kensi Blye, NCIS Special Agent
 Eric Christian Olsen as Marty Deeks, NCIS Investigator (Previously LAPD/NCIS Liaison Officer)
 Medalion Rahimi as Fatima Namazi, NCIS Special Agent
 Caleb Castille as Devin Roundtree, NCIS Special Agent (Previously FBI Agent)
 Gerald McRaney as Hollace Kilbride, a retired Admiral and friend of Henrietta Lange, later Operations Manager 
 LL Cool J as Sam Hanna, NCIS Senior Field Agent, Second in Command

Recurring 
 Kavi Ramachandran Ladnier as Shyla Dahr, NCIS Reserve Agent
 Natalia del Riego as Rosa Reyes, migrant seeking asylum, later fostered by Kensi and Deeks
 Richard Gant as former Colonel Raymond Hanna, father of Sam
 Bar Paly as Anatasia 'Anna' Kolcheck, Former ATF Agent and Callen's girlfriend, later fiancée
 Duncan Campbell as NCIS Special Agent Castor
 Alicia Coppola as FBI Senior Special Agent Lisa Rand
 Vyto Ruginis as Arkady Kolcheck, former KGB Operative, associate of Callen, and Anna's father
 Bill Goldberg as Lance Hamilton, DOJ Agent
 Erik Palladino as Special Deputy U.S. Marshal Vostanik Sabatino

Crossover

NCIS 

 Gary Cole as Alden Parker, NCIS Supervisory Special Agent of the Major Case Response Team in Washington, D.C.
 Wilmer Valderrama as Nick Torres, NCIS Special Agent

NCIS: Hawaiʻi 

 Vanessa Lachey as Jane Tennant, NCIS Special Agent in Charge of the NCIS: Hawaiʻi Field Office.
 Yasmine Al-Bustami as Lucy Tara, NCIS Special Agent

Episodes

Crossovers

On October 3, 2022, it was announced by Entertainment Weekly that a crossover event between NCIS: Los Angeles and its fellow NCIS franchise series NCIS and NCIS: Hawaiʻi was in production and scheduled to air in January 2023. NCIS: Los Angeles stars Chris O'Donnell and LL Cool J participated in the crossover, alongside Gary Cole, Wilmer Valderrama, and Brian Dietzen from NCIS and Vanessa Lachey, Yasmine Al-Bustami, and Noah Mills from NCIS: Hawaiʻi. The crossover event, referred to as the "NCIS-verse crossover", is the first time that all three series have crossed over. The crossover was confirmed by CBS on November 11, 2022, and given an air date of January 9. NCIS: Los Angeles temporarily moved to Monday for the event and was the third and final part of the crossover. O'Donnell and LL Cool J appeared in all three parts of the event. Cole, Valderrama, Lachey, and Al-Bustami, all appeared in the NCIS: Los Angeles portion, which is entitled "A Long Time Coming". All seven NCIS: Los Angeles cast members also appeared in the NCIS: Los Angeles portion.

Production

Development 
On March 31, 2022, it was announced that CBS had renewed NCIS: Los Angeles for a fourteenth season, alongside renewals for NCIS and NCIS: Hawaiʻi. Cast member Daniela Ruah directed the fifth episode of the season, "Flesh & Blood", as well as the fourteenth. On January 20, 2023, it was announced that the season would end on May 21, 2023. It was also confirmed that it would be the series finale.

Casting 
With the renewal in March 2022, it was expected that O'Donnell and LL Cool J would return. Longtime cast member Linda Hunt, who last appeared in the premiere of the previous season, is also expected to return. Each cast member will be absent for four episodes of the season. Returning guest stars for the season include Duncan Campbell, Alicia Coppola, Natalia del Riego, Richard Gant, Bar Paly, Kavi Ramachandran Ladnier, Pamela Reed, and Tye White

Design 
A new intro and lettering was introduced in Season 14.

Release and marketing 
On May 18, 2022, it was that the series would move from its previous Sunday 9:00 PM ET timeslot to an hour later at 10:00 PM, leading out of 60 Minutes, The Equalizer, and East New York. On June 23, 2022, the season was given a premiere date of October 9, 2022. In September 2022, the promotional poster for the season was released.

Ratings

References

External links 

2022 American television seasons
2023 American television seasons
14